Mentzelia lindleyi, commonly known as golden bartonia, Lindley's blazingstar, evening star, or blazing star, is an annual wildflower of western North America.

Distribution
The plant is found in the California Coast Ranges, San Francisco Bay Area, and San Joaquin Valley of California; and in Arizona.

Habitats it is found in include Coastal sage scrub and Southern oak woodland.

Description

The plant produces bright yellow flowers, 3 inches in diameter, with five petals.  One plant may have 25-35 flowers.

Cultivation
As an annual wildflower, Mentzelia lindleyi is cultivated as an ornamental plant in traditional flower beds, drought tolerant and habitat gardens, and desert rock gardens. It is a pollinator plant in wildlife gardens.  The plant prefers sandy soil in gardens.

References

Gallery

External links

Jepson Flora Project: Mentzelia lindleyi
Mentzelia lindleyi — images in the U.C. Photo gallery

lindleyi
Night-blooming plants
Flora of California
Flora of Arizona
Natural history of the California Coast Ranges
Natural history of the Central Valley (California)
Taxa named by Asa Gray
Taxa named by John Torrey
Garden plants of North America
Annual plants
Drought-tolerant plants
Flora without expected TNC conservation status